Rabbi Abraham Cooper (born 1950) is the associate dean and director of Global Social Action Agenda for the Simon Wiesenthal Center, a Jewish human rights organization.

Career 

Rabbi Cooper has his B.A. and M.S. degrees from Yeshiva University and a Ph.D. from the Jewish University of America. He is a recipient of Yeshiva University’s Bernard Revel Community Service Leadership Memorial Award and of the Orthodox Union’s National Leadership Award.

In the early 1970s, Cooper was involved in visiting Soviet Refuseniks, ultimately leading to his work to open the first Jewish cultural center in Moscow in the 1980s, and lecturing at the Soviet Academy of Sciences and the Sakharov Foundation later in his career.

In 1977, he came to Los Angeles to work with Rabbi Marvin Hier who founded the Simon Wiesenthal Center. Together with Rabbi Hier, Rabbi Cooper has met with world leaders, including Pope Benedict XVI, presidents, and foreign ministers.

In 1990, Cooper gave Public Enemy's Chuck D a "conscious-raising tour of the Holocaust Museum. I think Chuck has an open mind on certain levels, he said. “He may be ignorant of some of our history, but he’s not an anti-Semite.” The tour was in response to Rabbi Cooper's frustration with the American music industry, specifically the fact the record labels were releasing music with lyrics that were bigoted and/or racist.

In 1992 he publicly commented about the lyrics to Ice Cube's diss track No Vaseline, in which Cube advocated violence against Jerry Heller, whom he identified as a "white Jew": "We're not asking Ice Cube to mask the reality of the streets," he said. "By all means flag the social problems, but don't exploit them by turning a professional spat between a former manager and an artist into a racial dispute." Cube responded, "It's wrong for the rabbi to call me anti-Semitic. I respect Jewish people because they're unified. I wish black people were as unified."

In 1992, and again in 2003, he helped coordinate international conferences in Paris on antisemitism cosponsored by UNESCO. 

In 1997, he coordinated the center's international conference, "Property and Restitution-The Moral Debt to History" in Geneva, Switzerland.

He has testified before the United Nations in New York and Geneva, presented testimony at the US Senate, the Japanese Diet, the French Parliament, the OSCE and is a founding member of Israel's Global Forum on Antisemitism.

In February 2004, Rabbi Cooper traveled to Khartoum and was the first Jewish leader to meet with the leadership of Sudan including President Omar al-Bashir to discuss human rights and terrorism- related issues. He has met with King Hussein, King Abdullah and Prince Hassan of Jordan, former Indonesian President Abdurrahman Wahid and then Grand Mufti of Egypt, Sheik Tantawi.

In 2005, Rabbi Cooper participated in an international conference on terrorism convened in Madrid on the first anniversary of the infamous train bombings in Spain's capital.

Rabbi Cooper is a regular op-ed contributor to The New York Times, The Washington Post, the Los Angeles Times, the Miami Herald, USA Today, the Chicago Tribune, the Globe and Mail, National Post, Le Monde, the Japan Times, The Straits Times and Midstream magazine. He supervises the center's Digital Terrorism and Hate Project.

He has written the World Book Encyclopedia's entry on Raoul Wallenberg and edited two major works on this Holocaust hero.

In 2003, Rabbi Cooper served on the transition team for Governor-elect of California Arnold Schwarzenegger.

In 2016, Cooper was honored with the Rabbi Samuel S. and A. Irma Cohon Memorial Foundation Award

In 2019 Rabbi Cooper attended the Peace to Prosperity conference in Bahrain

Newsweek/Daily Beast lists Rabbi Cooper among the “50 Most Influential Rabbis in the United States".

See also 
 History of the Jews in Los Angeles

References 

1950 births
20th-century American rabbis
21st-century American rabbis
American people of Polish-Jewish descent
Orthodox rabbis from New York City
Simon Wiesenthal Center
The Holocaust and the United States
Living people